The Lagoa São Paulo Reserve is an ecological reserve in the state of São Paulo, Brazil.
It was created in 1942, but over the years suffered considerable degradation by illegal invasions and squatters.
It was largely flooded after construction of the Eng Sérgio Motta Dam on the Paraná River.
Only a small part of the original reserve remains, but some efforts are being made to restore it.

Creation

The Lagoa São Paulo Reserve was in the last large area of forest in the interior of the state of São Paulo, in a region known as the Pontal do Paranapanema.
The Morro do Diabo Forest Reserve, which later became the Morro do Diabo State Park, was created by law 12.279 of 29 October 1941.
The Lagoa São Paulo Reserve was created by decree 13.049 of 6 November 1942, and the Great Pontal Reserve was created by decree 13.075 of 25 November 1942.
These three reserves covered  of forest.

The governor of the state, Fernando Costa, created the reserves to protect public land that was being invaded by squatters and subject to many land disputes.

Degradation

Costa's successor, Adhemar de Barros  allowed continued destruction of the reserves, supported by the local mayors.
In the 1950s about 500 families were living inside the Lagoa São Paulo Reserve.
Jânio Quadros came to power in 1955 and took a series of measures to protect the Lagoa São Paulo and Great Pontal reserves, which still had much of their forest cover intact.
His successors were not interested in conservation, and in his second term Adhemar de Barros repealed the decrees published by Jânio Quadros, apart from one that had created the Morro do Diabo State Park.

Flooding

Damming of the Paraná River began in the 1980s for construction of the Engenheiro Sérgio Motta Hydroelectric Power Plant.
The dam was built by the Companhia Energética de São Paulo (CESP).
Flooding affected the municipalities of Presidente Epitácio and Caiuá on the left bank of the Paraná River and the Rio do Peixe, the lagoon complex of the Lagoa São Paulo Ecological Reserve and its surroundings.
CESP was responsible for indemnities arising from the flooding.

Protected areas created to compensate for the dam were the  Rio Ivinhema State Park, the  Aguapeí State Park, the  Rio do Peixe State Park and the  Cisalpina Private Natural Heritage Reserve.

Later history

However, as soon as the reservoir had filled the new environment was invaded by hunters, fishermen, cattle ranchers and landless rural laborers.
As of 2003 the Lagoa São Paulo Reserve had  in the municipality of Presidente Epitácio.
Fragments of the original forest and marsh remain, as well as 2,000 year old archaeological remains of the Guarani-Kaiowá people, although much of the area has been badly degraded. 
166 species of birds have been identified, some rare and others endangered in São Paulo state.
As of 2007 efforts were being made in a private/public partnership project to restore the environment through reforestation.
The reserve would be part of the proposed Trinational Biodiversity Corridor, which aims to provide forest connections between conservation units in Brazil, Paraguay and Argentina in the Upper Paraná ecoregion.

Notes

Sources

Ecological reserves of Brazil
Protected areas of São Paulo (state)
1942 establishments in Brazil
Squatting in Brazil